Vili may be: 

a Norse deity, see Vili and Ve
a people of Gabon and Congo-Brazzaville, see Vili people
a male first name in Finland
a male nickname in Hungary (short for Vilmos)
the trading name of Vili Milisits, South Australian baker, businessman and philanthropist
'-vili' a common name ending in Georgian, see Georgian names
the surname of the following people:
Tanner Vili (born 1981), Samoan rugby union player
Valerie Adams (formerly Valerie Vili) (born 1984), New Zealand shot putter
 ventilator-induced lung injury (VILI)

See also

 
 
 Villi (disambiguation)
 Vily (disambiguation)